Rosemary Willis (born 1953) was a close witness during the assassination of United States President John F. Kennedy.

Clearly seen in the Zapruder film at the start of the assassination wearing a white, hooded coat and a red skirt, while she trotted in the Dealey Plaza grass located to the presidential limousine's left, she runs southwestward and parallel with the limousine, which she faces for a short time when the limousine is to her direct right.

At circa Zapruder film frames 164-171 (hereafter "Z-164-171"), she starts to slow down, then she stops running and, simultaneous with her slowing/stopping, she slightly turns her level-facing head to end up looking towards the southeast corner of the Texas School Book Depository. Willis stated she stopped because she heard a loud noise that attracted her attention.

Immediately after the upright-sitting President John F. Kennedy is first hidden at frame 207 by the "Stemmons Freeway" traffic sign in the Zapruder film, Willis suddenly, and beginning at Z-214, snaps her head very rapidly 90 to 100 degrees westward (completely away from the Depository southeast corner) within 0.16 second to then face Abraham Zapruder and the grassy knoll by Z-217.

Precisely 0.60 second after starting her westward head snap towards  Zapruder and the grassy knoll, President Kennedy's head then emerges back into the Zapruder film view at Z-225. At that same instant, he was still sitting upright, and his facial expressions and arms were already clearly displaying his physical movements and neuro-physical sensed reactions to his already having been impacted by a bullet sometime prior to Z-225.

In 1978, Willis was interviewed by investigators for the House Select Committee on Assassinations (HSCA) and she stated that she heard three shots during the assassination.

She also stated to the HSCA that while she was still facing the grassy knoll picket fence, she was attracted to view the quick movement of a person on the grassy knoll who quickly dropped down behind a "wall", out of her view.

Willis was also documented in the HSCA report stating that her father, military veteran Phillip Willis, became very upset when the Dallas policemen, sheriffs, and detectives ran away from the grassy knoll, after they had first quickly run onto the grassy knoll where he thought a shot had been fired from.

Rosemary's sister, Linda Willis, stated to assassination researcher and author Richard Trask ("Pictures of the Pain" 1994) that after the assassination, she and Rosemary also saw someone find a piece of the president's head that had landed in the grass in a location at least  to the left of the president.

After the assassination, Willis, along with her sister, father, and her mother (Marilyn), were present at the Kodak photographic laboratory in Dallas getting her father's assassination-related photo slides developed. They were there at the same time as when the Zapruder film was also first developed and first shown to approximately nineteen persons.

Even though she was a very close assassination witness, Rosemary was never interviewed by any Warren Commission investigators.

Rosemary Willis became in the 1970s a school teacher in Dallas.

Notes

References
House Select Committee on Assassinations, Volume 12, Section 2, page 7, "Presence of Possible Gunman on the Grassy Knoll," Rose Mary Willis interview (note that her first name was misspelled in the HSCA report)

External links
An image-stabilized version of the Zapruder Film, running in a loop. Viewers must initially first allow a few seconds for this QuickTime-formatted version to load, after which the film runs continuously, forward and backward in an endless loop. Motion can be paused by tagging the keyboard "Enter" key, and individual frames can be advanced or backed up one frame at a time, using the keyboard arrow keys.
The Phil Willis Camera –  Argus Autronic I – Camera revue and User's Manual

1953 births
Living people
Witnesses to the assassination of John F. Kennedy